CES3 may refer to:
CES3 (gene)
 Edmonton/St. Albert (Delta Helicopters) Heliport, a Heliport in Canada